Juan Pierre van Deventer (born 26 March 1983) is a South African middle distance runner, who represented his country at the 2008 Summer Olympics and the 2010 IAAF World Indoor Championships.

He won the bronze medal in the 1500 metres at the 2008 African Championships in Athletics. Later that year, he became the first South African man to reach the Olympic 1500 m final at the 2008 Beijing Olympics, where he finished sixth. He has a 1500 m personal best of 3:34.46 and he is also the South African record holder in the 3000 metres with a time of 7:41.06 set in Stockholm in 2008.

Juan finished second in his indoor debut at the International PSD Bank Meeting in Düsseldorf, Germany in February 2010 also setting a new national 1500 m record of 3 min 37.25 sec – a record previously set by Sydney Maree 31 years ago in a time of 3 min 38.2 sec. He reached the 1500 m final at the 2010 World Indoor Championships and finished sixth.

Competition record

References

External links 
 

1983 births
Living people
South African male middle-distance runners
Olympic athletes of South Africa
Athletes (track and field) at the 2008 Summer Olympics
Competitors at the 2005 Summer Universiade
Competitors at the 2007 Summer Universiade
Athletes (track and field) at the 2007 All-Africa Games
African Games competitors for South Africa